Valeriy Fedorovych Hudz (12 February 1971 – 12 March 2022) was a Ukrainian serviceman.

Career 
Hudz's military career began in 1999, and ended in 2001. In 2014, following the Revolution of Dignity and the start of the war in Donbas, Hudz came out of retirement to serve in the Ukrainian Army once more.

He was a Colonel in the Armed Forces of Ukraine, serving as commander of the 24th Mechanized Brigade from 2017 to 2020. Hudz fought in sector "D" on the border war with Russia, in the area of ​​Volnovakha and Avdiivka. He died during the Russian invasion of Ukraine in the Luhansk region. He was posthumously awarded the highest award in Ukraine, Hero of Ukraine.

References

External links

1971 births
2022 deaths
People from Boryspil
Recipients of the title of Hero of Ukraine
Recipients of the Order of Bohdan Khmelnytsky, 3rd class
Ukrainian military personnel killed in the 2022 Russian invasion of Ukraine
Ukrainian military personnel of the war in Donbas